The New Britain Palaces were an American basketball team based in New Britain, Connecticut that was a member of the American Basketball League.

The team was previously known as the Camden Brewers who were taken over by New Britain during the 1933/34 season. Before the 1934/35 season, the team was renamed the New Britain Jackaways. During the 2nd half of the 1934/35 season, the team merged with the Newark Mules to become the New Britain Mules.

Year-by-year

American Basketball League (1925–1955) teams
Defunct basketball teams in Connecticut
Basketball teams established in 1933
Basketball teams disestablished in 1935
Sports in New Britain, Connecticut
1933 establishments in Connecticut
1935 disestablishments in Connecticut